Lieutenant-General Ye Win Oo (born 21 February 1966) is a Burmese military officer who is currently serving as the Joint Secretary of State Administration Council (SAC) and the Chief of Military Security Affairs. He was appointed as the Joint Secretary of the SAC on 2 February 2021, in aftermath of the 2021 Myanmar coup d'état.

Early life and education 
Ye Win Oo was born on 21 February 1966. He graduated from the Officers Training School, Bahtoo in 1989 as part of the 77th intake.

Military career 
From 2018 to 2020, he served as the commander of the Southwestern Command, which encompasses Ayeyarwady Region.

Sanctions 
The U.S. Department of the Treasury has imposed sanctions on "Ye Win Oo" since 11 February 2021, pursuant to Executive Order 14014, in response to the Burmese military’s coup against the democratically elected civilian government of Burma. The US sanctions include freezing of assets under the US and ban on transactions with US person.

The Government of Canada has imposed sanctions on him since 18 February 2021, pursuant to Special Economic Measures Act and Special Economic Measures (Burma) Regulations, in response to the gravity of the human rights and humanitarian situation in Myanmar (formerly Burma). Canadian sanctions include freezing of assets under Canada and ban on transactions with Canadian person.

HM Treasury and the Foreign, Commonwealth and Development Office of the United Kingdom have imposed sanctions on him since 25 February 2021, for his responsibility for serious human rights violations in Burma. The UK sanctions include freezing of assets under the UK and ban on traveling or transiting to the UK.

Furthermore, the Council of the European Union has imposed sanctions on him since 22 March 2021, pursuant to Council Regulation (EU) 2021/479 and Council Implementing Regulation (EU) 2021/480 which amended Council Regulation (EU) No 401/2013, for his responsibility for the military coup and the subsequent military and police repression against peaceful demonstrators. The EU sanctions include freezing of assets under member countries of the EU and ban on traveling or transiting to the countries.

Personal life
Ye Win Oo is married to Daw Nilar (b. 1968), and has one daughter, Theit Thinzar Ye (b. 1997).

See also
State Administration Council
Tatmadaw

References

1966 births
Living people
Burmese generals
Members of the State Administration Council
Specially Designated Nationals and Blocked Persons List
Officers Training School, Bahtoo alumni
Individuals related to Myanmar sanctions